Webbs Creek is a scattered village of Sydney, in the state of New South Wales, Australia. It is located in the City of Hawkesbury north-west of Wisemans Ferry. It is bounded in the south-west by the Hawkesbury River and is traversed by the creek from which it is named.

References

Suburbs of Sydney
City of Hawkesbury
Hawkesbury River